Lumbini College (Sinhala ලුම්බිණි විද්‍යාලය) or Lumbini Vidyalaya is a Sinhalese mixed school located in Colombo, Sri Lanka. The school was founded in 1929 and has a current enrollment of 4,300 students from primary class to secondary. The school was named as a national school in 2009.

History 
Lumbini College was established on 29 February 1929, as the Havelock Town Junior Mixed School, with 114 students. Although the school was a mixed school, only girls had attended. The staff consisted of the principal, D. R. Balasooriya, and three teachers. There was just a single building built from wooden planks.
 
The school was originally situated in Skelton Road, Colombo. In 2010 the primary school section was moved to a location in Wellawatte as a result of growth in enrolments, merging with Wallawatta Maha Vidyalaya, which was renamed Lumbini College. The school's secondary classes have remained at the original location.

On 2 June 2014 the President Mahinda Rajapaksa formally opened the school’s sports complex, which contains with a gym, tennis courts and sporting facilities.

Past headmasters and principals

D. R. Balasooriya		(1929–1932)
H. R. M. Kaluarachi		(1934)
D. S. Dissanayaka		(1934–1941)
D. J. Gunasingha		(1938–1941)
Wijesuriya			(1941–1944)
W. H. Pranandu			(1944–1947)
D. K. Jayawardana		(1947–1949)
D. J. Dias			(1949–1951)
A. W. Alvis			(1951–1959)
J. M. Kurupu			(1959–1962)
A. D. Sirisana			(1962)
J. S. H. Jasan			(1962–1969)
G. S. Weerasena		(1969–1976)
L. H. Edirisingha		(1976–1979)
W. P. A. Perera		(1979–1991)
G. Gunawardana		        (1991–1992)
G. Leyanaga 			(1992–1999)
J. G. Amarajeewa		(1999–2010)
Chandranath Amarathunga 	(2010–2012)
Oshara Panditarathna		(2012–2016)
K. G. Wimalasena		(2016 – 2019)
A.W. Nanayakkara (2019-2021)
Priyantha Karunarathna (2021-2022)
Sarath Gunathilaka (2022–present)

Alumni
The school's alumni are known as Old Lumbiniyanas

Notable alumni

References

External links

1929 establishments in Ceylon
Educational institutions established in 1929
National schools in Sri Lanka
Schools in Colombo